Return Creek Dam (Top Dam) is located about 9 km North East of Mount Garnet, Queensland and about 46 km West of Ravenshoe, Queensland. It was constructed for mining purposes within the Return (Nanyeta) Creek.

The Return Creek dam (not to be confused with Eastine Creek dam) was built in the early 1900s on the Return Creek, to supply the township of Mount Garnet and the copper and silver mine of a water supply. This dam was a large construction of logs and was still in use until, in 1967, when a large flood decimated it causing an evacuation of lower lying areas of the township. The dam was too far damaged to repair so the logs were cleared to allow Return Creek to flow freely. A new water supply for Mount Garnet was sourced elsewhere.

The dredging company of Tableland Tin constructed a different dam (Eastine Creek dam) in the 1930s to supply their mine houses of a water supply, as well as for their tin processing. This area is called Tabo and is just over a kilometer from Mount Garnet. This dam is situated on Eastine Creek and still supplies Tabo with water. Eastine Creek runs into Return Creek. Return Creek then flows into the Herbert River. Nanyeta is the aboriginal name for the creek, which means Return.

References

Reservoirs in Queensland
Buildings and structures in Far North Queensland
Dams in Queensland